Montiano  may refer to:

 Montiano, municipality in the Province of Forlì-Cesena in the Italian region Emilia-Romagna
 Montiano, Magliano in Toscana, a village in Tuscany, a frazione of the comune of Magliano in Toscana, province of Grosseto 
 , a village in Spain

See also 

 Montano